Edward Skorek (born 13 June 1943) is a Polish former volleyball player and coach. He was a member of the Poland national team with which he won the titles of the 1976 Olympic Champion and the 1974 World Champion. Skorek was inducted into the Volleyball Hall of Fame in 2006.

Honours

As a player
 National championships
 1964/1965  Polish Championship, with AZS AWF Warsaw
 1965/1966  Polish Championship, with AZS AWF Warsaw
 1968/1969  Polish Championship, with Legia Warsaw
 1969/1970  Polish Championship, with Legia Warsaw
 1975/1976  Italian Championship, with Panini Modena

As a coach
 National championships
 1975/1976  Italian Championship, with Panini Modena
 1992/1993  Polish Championship, with AZS Yawal Częstochowa
 1998/1999  Polish Cup, with Czarni Radom

State awards
 1998:  Officer's Cross of Polonia Restituta

External links

 
 
 Coach profile at LegaVolley.it 
 Player profile at LegaVolley.it   
 Player profile at Volleyhall.org
 Coach/Player profile at Volleybox.net

1943 births
Living people
People from Tomaszów Mazowiecki
Polish men's volleyball players
Polish volleyball coaches
Olympic volleyball players of Poland
Volleyball players at the 1968 Summer Olympics
Volleyball players at the 1972 Summer Olympics
Volleyball players at the 1976 Summer Olympics
Olympic medalists in volleyball
Olympic gold medalists for Poland
Medalists at the 1976 Summer Olympics
Officers of the Order of Polonia Restituta
Polish expatriate sportspeople in Italy
Expatriate volleyball players in Italy
Legia Warsaw (volleyball) players
Modena Volley players
AZS Częstochowa coaches
Czarni Radom coaches